Open philanthropy is a doctrine that the programming, operations, governance, effectiveness, and efficiency of nonprofit organizations should be available to the public, donors, and, especially, stakeholders in those nonprofits.

Among recent developments is the theory of open source governance which advocates the application of the philosophies of the free software movement to democratic principles which enables interested citizens to get more directly involved in the legislative process.

History
Since 2007 a variety of bloggers and writers, including Mark Surman, have proposed the concept of "Open Philanthropy".  Few of these early efforts seemed to get much traction with stakeholders or nonprofit leaders. Then early in 2010,  Lucy Bernholz again surfaced the  concept for how nonprofits should follow the conventions of open source and open government initiatives.

The effective altruism movement is a prominent proponent of analyzing, in a rubric with other criteria, the transparency of nonprofit organizations. The Open Philanthropy Project—a joint collaboration between GiveWell, a charity navigator, and Good Ventures, co-founded by a Facebook co-founder—"envision a world in which philanthropists increasingly document and share their research, reasoning, results and mistakes to help each other learn more quickly and serve the world more effectively."

Principles
The guiding principles of compliant organizations include:

Organizational efficiency
The plans, budgets, expenses, and programming of an organization shall be designed to ensure organizational focus on the mission of the organization. The majority of funds spent are in support of programs and services. Administrative and fundraising costs are kept within reasonable limits with a goal of more than 75 percent of funds allocated to program and outreach expenses.

Program efficiency
Organizations shall have a documented methodology to measure and accurately report programmatic achievements, and where appropriate, the actual cost per beneficiary for program services. Additionally, these efforts shall account, and if necessary discount, for program achievements that are accomplished through and with other organizations. Program costs shall be managed to be as reasonable as possible, without sacrificing services, quality, and long-term sustainability of services.

Organizational effectiveness
Programming is designed to be both sustainable and scalable using models other organizations can emulate and adopt or proving new concepts.  Fundraising efforts match anticipated programming needs.  Program efforts demonstrate high numbers of beneficiaries served with programs, which are sustainable for years and decades. Post-program monitoring and research designed to test impact, value, sustainability, and scalability of solutions. Measures of success are meaningful, accurate, and complete.

Governance, controls and compliance
Organization has documented strategic, fiscal, and annual plans and processes that are shared with appropriate stakeholders. Ongoing management review of key deliverables with risks identified and dis-aggregated by type. Mitigation strategies and processes incorporate controls, accountabilities, monitoring, and reporting. There shall be a clear organizational tone regarding ethical behavior in all the activities of the organization. Proactively explain actions and material decisions to stakeholders, including government, donors, beneficiaries, and the public at large.

Shared lessons and content
As the organization develops, implements, tests, and then refines procedures and processes, it shares those lessons in a non-competitive fashion with other organizations that might benefit from past successes. In regard to content, the organization will strive to collect, process, and share media assets such as video, still imagery, and audio in a manner that allows for release under creative commons, no commercial use, with attribution licensing terms. Where permissible and valuable, make data interoperable and release intellectual property under open source creative commons licensing terms.

Reporting and transparency
Organizations shall publish and make conveniently available important data about the organization, its staffing, resources, and governance. Reporting shall be in a format convenient for stakeholders and can include printed and digital reports, audio programming or real-time online systems. All reports shall be published on a timely basis and in particular financial data, including filed tax returns, shall be publicly available within 30 days of necessary audits. Organizations shall use best efforts to ensure the accuracy and timeliness of information released and shall promptly correct inaccuracies or incorrect materials.

Practical limitations
Within the scope of open philanthropy there are practical limitations to the extent all materials shall be open and visible by the public.  Materials whose release would be prohibited by law, or that may compromise the corporate or personal safety of others are exempt. Those items with contractual privacy or licensing arrangements do not require disclosure. Organizations shall not disclose information that compromises the integrity of others, and/or organizational processes and policies. Only to the extent as explicitly permitted, donor information shall be exempt.  In compliance with trademark law, trade names and marks are exempt from reuse without attribution.

See also
 Charity (practice)
 GiveWell
 Giving What We Can
 Earning to give
 Philanthropy

Similar concepts
 Accountability
 Corporate transparency
 Creative Commons
 Media transparency
 Open society
 Open source
 Open source governance
 Public trust

References

Political science
Political philosophy
Open government

it:Open Government